Interventionism may refer to:

Interventionism (politics), activity undertaken by a state to influence something not directly under its control
Economic interventionism, an economic policy position favouring government intervention in the market
Interventionism (medicine) is also a medical term in which patients are viewed as passive recipients receiving external treatments that have the effect of prolonging life
 Interventionism (theology)

See also
 Intervention (disambiguation)